William Wright Harts (August 29, 1866 – April 21, 1961) was a United States Army officer in the late 19th and early 20th centuries. He served in several conflicts and capacities, including in World War I, and he received the Army Distinguished Service Medal among other awards.

Biography
Harts was born on August 29, 1866, in Springfield, Illinois. Between 1884 and 1885, he attended Princeton University before entering the United States Military Academy, graduating from the latter in 1889.

Harts served in the United States Army Corps of Engineers until 1917, working on numerous construction projects. He participated in the Philippine Insurrection and served in the Philippines from 1903 to 1907. He graduated from the Engineer School of Application in 1892, and he graduated from the United States Army War College in 1912. He also taught at the latter. He graduated from the Naval War College in 1913. From 1913 to 1917, Harts served as the construction engineer of the Lincoln Memorial, and in 1917, he was the commandant of the Engineer School. He also served as an aide of U.S. President Woodrow Wilson from 1913 to 1918.

Harts served in France during World War I, initially commanding the Sixth Engineer Regiment. He was promoted to the rank of brigadier general on December 17, 1917, and he commanded a provisional brigade with the British Fifth Army. Harts then commanded the District of Paris from 1918 to 1919, and he received the Army Distinguished Service Medal during this time. The medal's citation reads:

He later served under Major General Henry Tureman Allen from 1919 to 1920 as the chief of staff to the American forces in Germany.

Harts graduated from the United States Army Field Artillery School in 1923 and from the Coast Artillery School in 1924. His promotion to brigadier general was made permanent in 1924. He commanded the Panama Canal's artillery defense from 1924 to 1926, and he served as the U.S. military attache in Paris from 1926 to 1930. Harts retired in 1930. He received several foreign awards during his career, including the Order of St Michael and St George, Legion of Honour, and Order of the Crown.

In retirement, Harts and his family lived in Madison, Connecticut. He died on April 21, 1961.

Personal life
Harts married Martha Davis Hale on October 27, 1898, and they had four children together. He served in numerous professional and social organizations.

References

Bibliography

1866 births
1961 deaths
People from Springfield, Illinois
People from Madison, Connecticut
Recipients of the Distinguished Service Medal (US Army)
Companions of the Order of St Michael and St George
Commandeurs of the Légion d'honneur
Officers of the Order of the Crown (Belgium)
United States Army generals of World War I
United States Military Academy alumni
American military personnel of the Philippine–American War
United States Army generals
Naval War College alumni
United States Army War College alumni
United States Army Corps of Engineers personnel
Military personnel from Illinois